Durban North College or Durban-Noord-kollege (in Afrikaans) is a high school situated to the north of Durban in KwaZulu-Natal, South Africa.

History
D.N.C. started as a purely Afrikaans school called Afrikaanse Hoërskool Durban-Noord.

In 1996, due to government policy in diversifying previously Afrikaans-only schools, the school changed its name to Durban North College and adopted a dual-medium language policy, offering all subjects in both English and Afrikaans.

Curriculum/Academic Information 
Each learner must study English or Afrikaans at Home language Level and  will study the alternative not chosen as an First Additional Language, and choose between  Mathematics or Mathematical Literacy and study Life Orientation which is compulsory.

Durban North College offers a variety of subjects listed below:

 Physical Science
 Geography
 Computer Applications Technology
 Tourism
 Engineering Graphics and Design
 Accounting
 History
 Business Studies
 Life Sciences 
 Visual Arts

All learners write Internally set School Papers and fall under The KZN Department of Education until Grade 12 in which all registered pupils sit to write their National Senior Certificate.

Sport Information 
Durban North College offers a variety of sports offered to its Students listed below:

 Cricket
 Rugby
 Hockey
 Netball
 Soccer
 Swimming
 Athletics
 Cross Country
 Chess

External links

 DNC official facebook page

Bilingual schools in South Africa
Schools in KwaZulu-Natal